Maga Maharaju is a 1983 Telugu film directed by Vijaya Bapineedu and produced by Shyam Prasad Arts. Chiranjeevi, Suhasini, Rao Gopal Rao, Udaykumar and Annapurna played main roles. The film was remade in Hindi as Ghar Sansar in 1986.

Plot
Raju (Chiranjeevi) is an unemployed youth. Raju has too many responsibilities and commitments from his family. His unmarried sister and sick parents expect a lot from him. Under these conditions, Raju meets a young girl, Suhasini, from a well-to-do family. She falls in love with him. Raju, in order to earn money, participates in a bicycle race, rides a bicycle, day and night nonstop for 8 days and wins money. Later, Suhasini marries him and solves all his problems.

Cast
 Chiranjeevi
 Suhasini
 Udaykumar
 Rallapalli
 Nirmallamma
 Rao Gopal Rao 
 Rohini
 Balaji
 Tulasi
 Hema Sundar
 Nutan Prasad
 Dham

Production 
Since Moulee could not allocate dates to finish directing the film, the film was completed by Vijaya Bapineedu.

Soundtrack

References

External links 
 

1983 films
1980s Telugu-language films
Films scored by K. Chakravarthy
Telugu films remade in other languages